

Nicaragua is a unitary republic, divided for administrative purposes into fifteen departments and two autonomous regions:

Autonomous regions 
In 1987, the new constitution established the Charter of Autonomy (limited self-government) for the former department of Zelaya, comprising the entire eastern half of the country. The department was divided into two autonomous regions (communities): the North Caribbean Coast Autonomous Region and the South Caribbean Coast Autonomous Region. The Charter of Autonomy is largely based on the model used by Spain. The communities are governed by a Governor and a Regional Council.

See also 

ISO 3166-2:NI

Notes 

  (INETER). . March, 2000.
  (INIFOM). .
 International Organization for Standardization (ISO). Codes for the representation of names of countries and their subdivisions. ISO 3166-2:NI.

 
Departments
Nicaragua, Departments
Nicaragua 1
Departments, Nicaragua
Nicaragua geography-related lists
South Caribbean Coast Autonomous Region
North Caribbean Coast Autonomous Region